Jiang Hao (Chinese: 姜灏; Pinyin: Jiāng Hào; born 28 December 1988) is a Chinese football player who currently plays for Dalian Duxing.

Club career
Jiang started his professional career when he was promoted to Chinese Super League side Dalian Shide first team squad in 2008. Playing as back-up goalkeeper, he didn't make any appearance between 2008 and 2011. On 19 July 2012, he made his senior debut in the fourth round of 2012 Chinese FA Cup which Dalian Shide lost to Guizhou Renhe 2–0 at Guiyang Olympic Centre.

Jiang transferred to another Super League club Jiangsu Sainty in January 2013. He made his debut for Jiangsu on 9 May 2017 in the last group match of 2017 AFC Champions League, which he kept a clean sheet as Jiangsu Suning beat Adelaide United 1–0.

On 28 February 2019, Jiang transferred to China League One side Beijing BSU.

Career statistics 
Statistics accurate as of match played 31 December 2020.

Honours

Club
Jiangsu Sainty
Chinese FA Cup: 2015

References

External links
 

1988 births
Living people
Chinese footballers
Footballers from Dalian
Dalian Shide F.C. players
Jiangsu F.C. players
Beijing Sport University F.C. players
Chinese Super League players
China League One players
Association football goalkeepers